Sarah Kawahara is a Canadian figure skater and choreographer who has won two Emmy Awards.

Personal life 
Born September 15, 1961, in Vancouver, Canada, Kawahara is of Japanese ancestry and lives in California. Her father is Hideo Kawahara (1920/1921-2011). She married actor Jamie Alcroft. They have three children together: Alysse Alcroft, Hayley Kiyoko Alcroft and Thatcher Alcroft.

Career 
Kawahara was coached by Osborne Colson. She joined the Ice Capades at age 17 and skated with them for seven years. In 1997, she became the first skater to win the Best Choreography Emmy Award, receiving the award for Scott Hamilton Upside Down. She won her second Emmy in 2002 for choreographing the opening and closing ceremonies of the 2002 Winter Olympics.

Kawahara has choreographed for numerous competitive skaters, including synchronized skaters. She was a coach and choreographer for the film I, Tonya and for the television series Spinning Out.

Work as a choreographer

Films 
 Blades of Glory
 Go Figure
 I, Tonya

TV specials 
An Evening on Ice
Concert on Ice
 Nancy Kerrigan, Special Dreams on Ice
 Reflections on Ice: Michelle Kwan skates to the Music of Mulan
 Michelle Kwan skates to Disney's Greatest Hits (2000)
 Michelle Kwan, Princesses on Ice
 Scott Hamilton and Friends
 Scott Hamilton Upside Down

Touring shows
 The Wizard of Oz on Ice
 The Spirit of Pocohontas
 Hercules on Ice
 Anastasia on Ice
 Holiday on Ice
 Stars on Ice
 Ice Capades
 Champions on Ice
 Disney on Ice

Skaters
 Scott Hamilton
 Kurt Browning
 Ilia Kulik
 Michelle Kwan
 Kristi Yamaguchi
 Dorothy Hamill
 Robin Cousins
 Charlie Tickner
 John Curry
 Christopher Bowman
 Surya Bonaly
 Chen Lu
 Nancy Kerrigan
 Tai Babilonia / Randy Gardner
 Ekaterina Gordeeva / Sergei Grinkov
 Oksana Baiul
 Marina Klimova / Sergei Ponomarenko
 Victor Petrenko
 Pang Qing / Tong Jian
 Beatrisa Liang
 Miami University Synchronized Skating Team in their World Silver Medal (2007) routine.

References

External links
 

Canadian female figure skaters
Figure skating choreographers
Emmy Award winners
Canadian sportswomen
Place of birth missing (living people)
Living people
Canadian sportspeople of Japanese descent
Canadian expatriate sportspeople in the United States
1961 births